Apparent mineralocorticoid excess is an autosomal recessive disorder causing hypertension (high blood pressure), hypernatremia (increased blood sodium concentration) and hypokalemia (decreased blood potassium concentration). It results from mutations in the HSD11B2 gene, which encodes the kidney isozyme of 11β-hydroxysteroid dehydrogenase type 2. In an unaffected individual, this isozyme inactivates circulating cortisol to the less active metabolite cortisone. The inactivating mutation leads to elevated local concentrations of cortisol in the aldosterone sensitive tissues like the kidney. Cortisol at high concentrations can cross-react and activate the mineralocorticoid receptor due to the non-selectivity of the receptor, leading to aldosterone-like effects in the kidney. This is what causes the hypokalemia, hypertension, and hypernatremia associated with the syndrome. Patients often present with severe hypertension and end-organ changes associated with it like left ventricular hypertrophy, retinal, renal and neurological vascular changes along with growth retardation and failure to thrive. In serum both aldosterone and renin levels are low.

Signs and symptoms

This disorder presents similarly to hyperaldosteronism, leading to feedback inhibition of aldosterone. Common symptoms include hypertension, hypokalemia, metabolic alkalosis, and low plasma renin activity.

DOC excess syndrome is an excessive secretion of 21-hydroxyprogesterone also called 11-Deoxycorticosterone from adrenal glands and may cause mineralocorticoid hypertension.

Genetics

AME is inherited in an autosomal recessive manner. This means the defective gene responsible for the disorder is located on an autosome, and two copies of the defective gene (one inherited from each parent) are required in order to be born with the disorder. The parents of an individual with an autosomal recessive disorder both carry one copy of the defective gene, but usually do not experience any signs or symptoms of the disorder.

Diagnosis
Other conditions such as Liddle's Syndrome can mimic the clinical features of AME, so diagnosis can be made by calculating the ratio of free urinary cortisol to free urinary cortisone.  Since AME patients create less cortisone, the ratio will much  be higher than non-affected patients. Alternatively, one could differentiate between the two syndromes by administering a potassium-sparing diuretic. Patients with Liddle's syndrome will only respond to a diuretic that binds the ENaC channel, whereas those with AME will respond to a diuretic that binds to ENaC or the mineralcorticoid receptor.

Treatment
The treatment for AME is based on the blood pressure control with Aldosterone antagonist like Spironolactone which also reverses the hypokalemic metabolic alkalosis and other anti-hypertensives. Renal transplant is found curative in almost all clinical cases.AME is exceedingly rare, with fewer than 100 cases recorded worldwide.

Liquorice consumption may also cause a temporary form of AME due to its ability to block 11β-hydroxysteroid dehydrogenase type 2, in turn causing increased levels of cortisol. Cessation of licorice consumption will reverse this form of AME.

See also
 Inborn errors of steroid metabolism
 11β-Hydroxylase I deficiency
 Hyperaldosteronism
 Pseudohyperaldosteronism
 Glucocorticoid-remediable aldosteronism
 Aldosterone and aldosterone synthase
 Maria New

References

External links 
 

Adrenal gland disorders
Autosomal recessive disorders
Cholesterol and steroid metabolism disorders
Genetic diseases and disorders
Rare syndromes